Vladimir Yakovlevich Balon  (February 23, 1937, Leningrad — February 2, 2013  Moscow) was a Soviet and Russian actor, a professional fencer, Master of sports of the USSR (1956), champion of the USSR in fencing (juniors, 1958, adults 1961) foil, stunt. Since 1990 to 2002 was the director of the studio  Mosfilm-Autotrake.

Selected filmography
 Hussar Ballad (1962) as Kutuzov's adjutant  
  Give Me a Book of Complaints (Дайте жалобную книгу, 1965) as journalist, Yuri Nikitin's friend
 They're Calling, Open the Door (Звонят, откройте дверь, 1966) as  teacher of fencing
 Anna Karenina (Анна Каренина, 1967) as officer at the races (uncredited)
 Sea Tales (Морские рассказы, 1967) as Vladimir Yakovlevich
 Nikolai Bauman (Николай Бауман, 1967) as Ilya Sats
 Step Off the Roof (Шаг с крыши, 1970) as musketeer Moruak
 D'Artagnan and Three Musketeers (д'Артаньян и три мушкетёра, 1978) as de Jussac
 Gardes-Marines, Ahead! (Гардемарины, вперёд!, 1988) as Jacques
 Island of Rusty General (Остров ржавого генерала, 1988) as general  
 Stalin's Funeral (Похороны Сталина, 1990) as doctor
 Viva Gardes-Marines! (Виват, гардемарины!, 1991) as Jacques
 Musketeers Twenty Years After (Мушкетёры двадцать лет спустя, 1992) as de Jussac
 The Return of the Musketeers, or The Treasures of Cardinal Mazarin (Возвращение мушкетёров, или Сокровища кардинала Мазарини, 2007) as de Jussac

References

External links

 Сайт, посвященный Владимиру Яковлевичу Балону
 Учитель фехтования. Интервью в газете МК

1937 births
2013 deaths
Russian male film actors
Soviet male film actors
Lesgaft National State University of Physical Education, Sport and Health alumni
Soviet male fencers
Sportspeople from Saint Petersburg
Male actors from Saint Petersburg
Deaths from lung cancer in Russia